Melissa Rodríguez (born September 13, 1994) is a National record-holding breaststroke swimmer from Mexico.

Career
As of November 2014, Rodríguez holds the Mexican Records in the long-course (50m) 50 and 100 breaststrokes.

At the 2014 Central American and Caribbean Games, she set the Games Records by winning the 50 breaststroke event (32.21).

See also
List of Pennsylvania State University Olympians

References

External links

1994 births
Living people
Mexican female swimmers
Sportspeople from Chihuahua (state)
People from Chihuahua City
Swimmers at the 2011 Pan American Games
Female breaststroke swimmers
Central American and Caribbean Games gold medalists for Mexico
Central American and Caribbean Games silver medalists for Mexico
Central American and Caribbean Games bronze medalists for Mexico
Competitors at the 2010 Central American and Caribbean Games
Competitors at the 2014 Central American and Caribbean Games
Swimmers at the 2019 Pan American Games
Central American and Caribbean Games medalists in swimming
Pan American Games competitors for Mexico
Swimmers at the 2020 Summer Olympics
Olympic swimmers of Mexico
21st-century Mexican women